Charles Jourdain (born November 27, 1995) is a Canadian mixed martial arts (MMA) fighter who is currently competing in the Ultimate Fighting Championship's (UFC) Featherweight division. He was previously a TKO Major League MMA Double Champion, winning the TKO Featherweight Championship and the TKO Interim Lightweight Championship.

Background
Jourdain was born and raised in Beloeil Quebec, Canada. He has two older brothers and a younger brother Louis Jourdain, who has been quite involved in his mixed martial arts career and pursues a career of his own.

Mixed martial arts career

Early career
Jourdain began competing in mixed martial arts in 2013. He earned an amateur record of 8–2, fighting 8 times in 2013 winning 7 of those bouts. He also competed in FightQuest Amateur Combat in 2014 were he won the vacant FightQuest Featherweight Championship and earned a "Performance of the Night" bonus. After going professional in 2015 he competed exclusively in Canadian MMA promotions. Jourdain made his MMA debut against Thomas Sumantri on May 21, 2016 at LAMMQ - Quebec Mixed Martial Arts League 5. He won the fight via knockout with a flying knee in the first round, earning a Knockout of the Night bonus. He was the  TKO Featherweight and Interim Lightweight champion, and amassed a record 9–1 prior to signing with Ultimate Fighting Championship in 2019.

Ultimate Fighting Championship
Making his promotional debut on short notice, Jourdain faced Des Green on May 18, 2019 at UFC Fight Night 152. He lost the fight via unanimous decision.

Jourdain would next face Doo Ho Choi at UFC Fight Night: Edgar vs. The Korean Zombie on December 21, 2019. Choi would drop Jourdain early with the rest of the round consisting of exchanges that would lead to Choi breaking his left arm on a spinning backfist attempt, Jourdain would later drop Choi with 0:21 seconds left in round 1. Round 2 would see more exchanges between the two fighters  With 30 seconds left in the round, Jourdain dropped Choi with a left cross and then a right hook. He won the fight via TKO at 4:32 seconds of round 2.  Earning him his first win in the promotion and a Fight of the Night bonus.

Returning to action amidst the COVID-19 pandemic, Jourdain faced Andre Fili at UFC on ESPN: Eye vs. Calvillo on June 13, 2020. The first round saw the two exchanging on the feet with Jourdain knocking Fili down with a overhand left. Fili secured  a take down near the end of the round two.  Jourdain lost the fight via split decision.

Jourdain next faced Joshua Culibao on October 4, 2020 at UFC on ESPN: Holm vs. Aldana. The bout would see both fighters push the pace and employ their game plans. The fight would go the distance ending with a split draw result.

Jourdain was scheduled to face Steve Garcia on March 13, 2021 at UFC Fight Night 187. On February 24, Garcia pulled out of the fight due to injury and was replaced by UFC newcomer Marcelo Rojo. He won the fight by technical knockout in the third round.

Jourdain was scheduled to face Lerone Murphy on September 4, 2021 at UFC Fight Night 191. However, Murphy was pulled from the event due to visa issues, and he was replaced by Julian Erosa. Jourdain lost the fight via a submission in round three.

As the last bout of his prevailing contract, Jourdain faced Andre Ewell on December 18, 2021 at UFC Fight Night: Lewis vs. Daukaus. He won the bout via unanimous decision.

As the first bout of his new four-fight contract, Jourdain is scheduled to face Ilia Topuria, replacing Movsar Evloev, on January 22, 2022 at UFC 270.

Jourdain was scheduled to face Ilia Topuria, replacing  Movsar Evloev, on January 22, 2022, at UFC 270. However, Topuria was pulled from the card due to a medical issue related to cutting weight and the bout was cancelled.

Jourdain faced Lando Vannata on April 23, 2022 at UFC Fight Night 205.  He won the fight via a guillotine choke in round one.

Jourdain faced Shane Burgos on July 16, 2022, at UFC on ABC 3. He lost the back-and-forth fight via majority decision.

Jourdain faced Nathaniel Wood on September 3, 2022 at UFC Fight Night 209. He lost the fight via unanimous decision.

Jourdain is next expected to face Kron Gracie at UFC 288 on May 6, 2023.

Championships and accomplishments

Ultimate Fighting Championship
Fight of the Night (One time) vs. 
TKO Major League MMA
TKO Double Champion
TKO Featherweight Championship (One time)
Interim TKO Lightweight Championship (One time)
Ligue d'Arts Martiaux Mixtes du Québec
LAMMQ 5 Knockout of the Night
FightQuest Amateur Combat
FightQuest Featherweight Championship
FightQuest Performance of the Night

Mixed martial arts record

|-
|Loss
|align=center|13–6–1
|Nathaniel Wood
|Decision (unanimous)
|UFC Fight Night: Gane vs. Tuivasa
|
|align=center|3
|align=center|5:00
|Paris, France
|
|-
|Loss
|align=center|13–5–1
|Shane Burgos
|Decision (majority)
|UFC on ABC: Ortega vs. Rodríguez
|
|align=center|3
|align=center|5:00
|Elmont, New York, United States
|
|-
|Win
|align=center|13–4–1
|Lando Vannata
|Submission (guillotine choke)
|UFC Fight Night: Lemos vs. Andrade
|
|align=center|1
|align=center|2:32
|Las Vegas, Nevada, United States
|
|-
|Win
|align=center|12–4–1
|Andre Ewell
|Decision (unanimous)
|UFC Fight Night: Lewis vs. Daukaus
|
|align=center|3
|align=center|5:00
|Las Vegas, Nevada, United States
|
|-
|Loss
|align=center|11–4–1
|Julian Erosa
|Submission (D'Arce choke)
|UFC Fight Night: Brunson vs. Till
|
|align=center|3
|align=center|2:56
|Las Vegas, Nevada, United States
|
|-
|Win
|align=center|11–3–1
|Marcelo Rojo
|TKO (punches)
|UFC Fight Night: Edwards vs. Muhammad
|
|align=center|3
|align=center|4:31
|Las Vegas, Nevada, United States
|
|-
|Draw
|align=center|
|Joshua Culibao
|Draw (split)
|UFC on ESPN: Holm vs. Aldana
|
|align=center|3
|align=center|5:00
|Abu Dhabi, United Arab Emirates
|
|-
| Loss
| align=center|10–3
| Andre Fili
| Decision (split)
| UFC on ESPN: Eye vs. Calvillo
| 
| align=center|3
| align=center|5:00
| Las Vegas, Nevada, United States
|
|-
| Win
| align=center|10–2
| Choi Doo-ho
| TKO (punches)
| UFC Fight Night: Edgar vs. The Korean Zombie
| 
| align=center|2
| align=center|4:32
| Busan, South Korea
| 
|-
| Loss
| align=center|9–2
| Desmond Green
| Decision (unanimous)
| UFC Fight Night: dos Anjos vs. Lee
| 
| align=center|3
| align=center|5:00
| Rochester, New York, United States
|
|-
| Win
| align=center|9–1
| Damien Lapilus
| TKO (punches)
| TKO 47: Jourdain vs Lapilus
| 
| align=center|5
| align=center|2:02
| Montreal, Quebec, Canada
| 
|-
| Win
| align=center|8–1
| Alex Morgan
| Submission (guillotine choke)
| TKO 45: Jourdain vs Morgan
| 
| align=center|1
| align=center|4:38
| Montreal, Quebec, Canada
| 
|-
| Win
| align=center| 7–1
| Kevin Généreux
| Submission (rear naked choke)
| TKO Fight Night 1
| 
| align=center| 2
| align=center| 4:08
| Montreal, Quebec, Canada
| 
|-
| Win
| align=center| 6–1
| Matar Lo
| KO (punches)
| TKO 42: Nogueira vs. Laramie
| 
| align=center| 1
| align=center| 2:19
| Laval, Quebec, Canada
|
|-
| Loss
| align=center| 5–1
| T.J. Laramie
| Decision (unanimous)
| TKO 41: Champions
| 
| align=center| 5
| align=center| 5:00
| Montreal, Quebec, Canada
| 
|-
| Win
| align=center| 5–0
| William Romero
| TKO (punches)
| TKO 39: Ultimatum
| 
| align=center| 3
| align=center| 2:04
| Saint-Roch-de-l'Achigan, Quebec, Canada
| 
|-
| Win
| align=center| 4–0
| Mathieu Morciano
| TKO (punches)
| TKO 38: Ascension
| 
| align=center| 2
| align=center| 1:42
| Montreal, Quebec, Canada
|
|-
| Win
| align=center| 3–0
| Michael Cyr
| Submission (rear naked choke)
| TKO 37: Rivals
| 
| align=center| 2
| align=center| 1:29
| Montreal, Quebec, Canada
| 
|-
| Win
| align=center| 2–0
| Marc-Antoine Lidji
| TKO (punches)
| TKO 36: Resurrection
| 
| align=center| 3
| align=center| 4:02
| Montreal, Quebec, Canada
| 
|-
| Win
| align=center| 1–0
| Thomas Sumantri
| KO (flying knee)
| LAMMQ 5
| 
| align=center| 1
| align=center| 4:32
| Quebec City, Quebec, Canada
|

See also
 List of current UFC fighters
 List of Canadian UFC fighters
 List of male mixed martial artists

References

External links
 
 

1995 births
Living people
Canadian male mixed martial artists
Featherweight mixed martial artists
Mixed martial artists utilizing Brazilian jiu-jitsu
Sportspeople from Montreal
Ultimate Fighting Championship male fighters
Canadian practitioners of Brazilian jiu-jitsu
People awarded a black belt in Brazilian jiu-jitsu